Jeanne Driessen (born in Maaseik on 3 May 1892; died 15 July 1997) was a Christen-Democratisch en Vlaams politician when the party was still known as the Christelijke Volkspartij. Her early work in the party started in 1924 and her father Louis had served as mayor of Maaseik. She was first elected to a position in 1927 and served as a Sénatrice from 1950 to 1965. The Belgian Senate noted her death at 105.

References

External links 
 Jeanne Driessen in ODIS - Online Database for Intermediary Structures  

Christian Democratic and Flemish politicians
Members of the Senate (Belgium)
Belgian centenarians
People from Maaseik
1892 births
1997 deaths
20th-century Belgian women politicians
20th-century Belgian politicians
Women centenarians